Cardinal is an unincorporated community located in the Municipality of Lorne in south central Manitoba, Canada.  It is located approximately 110 kilometers (68 miles) southwest of Winnipeg, on the west side of Provincial Road 244.

See also 
Immigration to Canada
List of regions of Manitoba
List of rural municipalities in Manitoba

References 

Manitoba communities with majority francophone populations
Unincorporated communities in Pembina Valley Region